Chancellor is a town in Turner County, South Dakota, United States. The population was 300 at the 2020 census.

The community was named for Otto von Bismarck, Chancellor of the German Empire.

Geography

Chancellor has been assigned ZIP code 57015 and FIPS place code 11380.

Demographics

2010 census
As of the census of 2010, there were 264 people, 118 households, and 75 families residing in the town. The racial makeup of the town was 97.3% White, 0.4% African American, 0.4% Native American, 0.4% Asian, and 1.5% from two or more races. Hispanic or Latino of any race were 0.8% of the population.

There were 118 households, of which 28.8% had children under the age of 18 living with them, 53.4% were married couples living together, 7.6% had a female householder with no husband present, 2.5% had a male householder with no wife present, and 36.4% were non-families. 33.9% of all households were made up of individuals, and 11.9% had someone living alone who was 65 years of age or older. The average household size was 2.24 and the average family size was 2.80.

The median age in the town was 39.9 years. 22.3% of residents were under the age of 18; 9.9% were between the ages of 18 and 24; 24.3% were from 25 to 44; 25% were from 45 to 64; and 18.6% were 65 years of age or older. The gender makeup of the town was 49.6% male and 50.4% female.

2000 census
As of the census of 2000, there were 328 people, 134 households, and 88 families residing in the town. The population density was 1,328.8 people per square mile (506.6/km2). There were 142 housing units at an average density of 575.3 per square mile (219.3/km2). The racial makeup of the town was 97.87% White, 0.91% Native American, and 1.22% from two or more races. Hispanic or Latino of any race were 0.30% of the population.

There were 134 households, out of which 35.1% had children under the age of 18 living with them, 56.0% were married couples living together, 8.2% had a female householder with no husband present, and 33.6% were non-families. 32.1% of all households were made up of individuals, and 15.7% had someone living alone who was 65 years of age or older. The average household size was 2.45 and the average family size was 3.07.

In the town, the population was spread out, with 26.8% under the age of 18, 9.1% from 18 to 24, 28.7% from 25 to 44, 18.0% from 45 to 64, and 17.4% who were 65 years of age or older. The median age was 32 years. For every 100 females, there were 90.7 males. For every 100 females age 18 and over, there were 92.0 males.

The median income for a household in the town was $30,500, and the median income for a family was $42,250. Males had a median income of $22,750 versus $19,167 for females. The per capita income for the town was $18,156. None of the families and 4.2% of the population were living below the poverty line, including no under eighteens and 11.8% of those over 64.

Education
Chancellor is a part of the Lennox School District 41-4, which operates LWC Junior High School/Lennox High School in Lennox.

References

German-American culture in South Dakota
Towns in South Dakota
Towns in Turner County, South Dakota
Sioux Falls, South Dakota metropolitan area
Populated places established in 1895
1895 establishments in South Dakota